The following is a list of cabinets of Turkey since 1920. Numbered I to V are leaders predating the declaration of the Republic of Turkey on October 29, 1923. 

The list includes the one-party period of the Republic of Turkey (1925–1945) and the subsequent multi-party period of the Republic of Turkey (1945–present).

List

Statistics 
Including the one-party period, shortest government in Turkey's history was DYP minority government led by Tansu Çiller, which only lasted 25 days. Longest government in duty was first cabinet of Recep Tayyip Erdogan, which lasted 1629 days. Longest coalition was DSP, ANAP and MHP coalition led by Bülent Ecevit, which lasted 1270 days.

Excluding one-party period, only 3 governments span into full-extend of their time (came with an election, ended with regular time): first Demirel government, first Özal government and second Erdoğan government.

Notes

See also
 List of presidents of Turkey
 List of prime ministers of Turkey
 Coalition governments in Turkey
 List of the main opposition leaders of Turkey

References

Turkey
Politics of Turkey
List